La Bonanova is a railway station situated under the Via Augusta at Carrer de Ganduxer in the Sarrià-Sant Gervasi district of Barcelona. It is served by line L6 of the Barcelona Metro and lines S1 and S2 of the Metro del Vallès commuter rail system. All these lines are operated by Ferrocarrils de la Generalitat de Catalunya, who also run the station.

The station has twin tracks, with two side platforms and a central island platform. The side platforms are used for boarding, whilst the central platform is used for alighting, a configuration that is known as the Barcelona solution. In the case of La Bonanova, the centre platform is long enough to accommodate a four car train, but the side platforms are shorter, meaning that it is only possible to board three of the train's cars from them.

The station platforms are accessed by a single ticket hall at the western end of the station, which has street accesses to both sides the Via Augusta. A second hall at the east end of the station exists, but is now used only as an emergency exit.

The line on which La Bonanova is located opened in 1863, but the first station on the site did not open until 1887. The current station was opened in 1952, when the line through the station was put underground.

See also
List of Barcelona Metro stations
List of railway stations in Barcelona

References

External links
 
 Information and photos about the station at Trenscat.com
 Information and photos about the station at TransporteBCN.es

Stations on the Barcelona–Vallès Line
Barcelona Metro line 6 stations
Railway stations in Spain opened in 1887
Railway stations in Spain opened in 1952
Transport in Sarrià-Sant Gervasi
Railway stations located underground in Spain